Micromyrtus barbata is a plant species of the family Myrtaceae endemic to Western Australia.

It blooms between July and September producing cream-white flowers

It is found on sandplains and sand dunes in the central Goldfields-Esperance region of Western Australia in the Gibson Desert, Great Victoria Desert and Little Sandy Desert where it grows in red sandy soils.

References

barbata
Flora of Western Australia
Plants described in 1980